Tanga (Deu no New York Times?) is a 1987 Brazilian comedy film directed by the comic artist Henfil and written by him and Joffre Rodrigues.

Synopsis
The setting is Tanga, a small miserable island with an illiteracy rate of 99%.  The country is headed by Herr Walkyria Von Mariemblau (Rubens Corrêa). Each day, a copy of The New York Times is delivered to the dictator, the only such copy available on the island.  After he reads each day's newspaper, he incinerates it to prevent it from falling into the hands of communist guerrillas, who covet the newspaper, sharing his belief that "knowledge is power."

Cast
 Rubens Corrêa as Herr Walkyria Von Mariemblau 
 Elke Maravilha as Frau Regine de Regine
 Cristina Pereira as Liga da Mulher Ideal 
 Henfil as Kubanin
 Flávio Migliaccio as Partido Comunista Tanganês

The cast also includes
Chico Anysio,
Ricardo Blat,
Zózimo Bulbul,
Haroldo Costa,
Daniel Filho,
Jaguar,
Ken Kaneko,
Procópio Mariano,
Hélio Pellegrino,
Alan Riding,
Joffre Rodrigues, and
Fausto Wolff.

Awards
Golden Sun for Best Film (Sol de Ouro de Melhor filme pelo Júri Popular) at the Rio Cine Festival

See also
List of Brazilian films of the 1980s

Notes

References

External links

1987 films
1987 comedy films
1980s Portuguese-language films
Brazilian comedy films
Films scored by Wagner Tiso